Bedford Park may refer to:
 Bedford Park, South Australia, a suburb of Adelaide, Australia
 Bedford Park, Toronto, a neighborhood of Toronto, Ontario, Canada
 Bedford Park, Bedford, an urban park in Bedford, UK
 Bedford Park, London, a district of Chiswick, London, UK
 Bedford Park, Illinois, U.S., a village
 Bedford Park, Bronx, a neighborhood of the Bronx, New York City, New York, U.S.
 Bedford, Western Australia, a suburb of Perth, Western Australia formerly known as Bedford Park

See also
Bedford Park Boulevard (disambiguation)
Bedfords Park, a park in the London Borough of Havering